Calyptomenidae is a family of passerine birds found in Africa, the Malay Peninsula and Borneo. There are six species in two genera.

The species in this family were formerly included in the broadbill family Eurylaimidae. A molecular phylogenetic study published in 2006 found that the species in these two genera were not closely related to the other broadbills. These two genera are now placed in a separate family.

Genera
The family contains six species in two genera:

References

 
Bird families